Aslan(cheriy) Kitovich Tkhakushinov (born July 12, 1947) is the former Head of the Republic of Adygea, Russia, and is an ethnic Adyghe.

Tkhakushinov was born in the aul of Ulyap in Krasnogvardeysky District and graduated in 1971 from the Adyghean State Pedagogical University. He obtained a degree in Sociology from the same university in 1977. He worked at the Maykop State Technical University from 1983 to 2006 becoming president of the university in 1994.

He was a deputy on Maykop City Council from 1981 to 1990. He was elected to the legislature of Adygea in 1990.

Tkhakushinov is active in meeting with the members of the Circassians diasporas, and trying to solve the problem of the Circassians compatriots living abroad. In December 2010, he issued a decree to elaborate a program to help resettling the compatriots living in diaspora, whom want to return voluntarily to the motherland.

Tkhakushinov visited different countries with an effective Circassians diasporas, such as his visit to Jordan in 1997

On 12 January 2017, Tkhakushinov left his post as the republics president. Russian president Vladimir Putin, appointed Murat Kumpilov as the acting head of the Republic of Adygea.

He is married and has a son.

References

External links
Official website of the Republic of Adygea. Aslan Kitovich Tkhakushinov 
Rossiyskaya Gazeta. Владимир Путин внес на рассмотрение Государственного Совета - Хасэ Адыгеи кандидатуру Асланчерия Тхакушинова для наделения его полномочиями главы республики 

Circassian people of Russia
Circassians
1947 births
Heads of the Republic of Adygea
United Russia politicians
21st-century Russian politicians
Living people
Russian Sunni Muslims
People from Krasnogvardeysky District, Adygea